German submarine U-289 was a Type VIIC U-boat of Nazi Germany's Kriegsmarine during World War II.

The submarine was laid down on 12 September 1942 at the Bremer Vulkan yard at Bremen-Vegesack as yard number 54. She was launched on 25 May 1943 and commissioned on 10 July under the command of Kapitänleutnant Alexander Hellwig.

She did not sink or damage any ships.

She was sunk by a British destroyer on 31 May 1944.

Design
German Type VIIC submarines were preceded by the shorter Type VIIB submarines. U-289 had a displacement of  when at the surface and  while submerged. She had two shafts and two  propellers.

U-289 was fitted with five  torpedo tubes (four fitted at the bow and one at the stern), fourteen torpedoes, one  SK C/35 naval gun, (220 rounds), one  Flak M42 and two twin  C/30 anti-aircraft guns. The boat had a complement of between forty-four and sixty.

Service history
U-289 served with the 8th U-boat Flotilla for training from July 1943 to March 1944 and operationally with the 3rd flotilla from 1 April. She was reassigned to the 13th flotilla in early May 1944.

First patrol
The boat's initial foray, which was preceded by a short voyage from Kiel to Bergen in Norway, began with her departure from the Nordic port on 19 April 1944 and finished at Narvik on 6 May.

Second patrol and loss
She departed Narvik on 12 May 1944.

Fifty-one men died; there were no survivors.

References

Bibliography

External links

German Type VIIC submarines
U-boats commissioned in 1943
U-boats sunk in 1944
World War II submarines of Germany
1943 ships
Ships built in Bremen (state)
U-boats sunk by depth charges
U-boats sunk by British warships
Ships lost with all hands
World War II shipwrecks in the Arctic Ocean
Maritime incidents in May 1944